Chassal is a former commune in the Jura department in Bourgogne-Franche-Comté in eastern France. On 1 January 2019, it was merged into the new commune Chassal-Molinges.

Population

See also
Communes of the Jura department

References

Former communes of Jura (department)
Jura communes articles needing translation from French Wikipedia
Populated places disestablished in 2019